Khoshkrud (also Romanized as Khoshkrūd; also known as Pā’īn Khoshkeh Rūd) is a village in Goli Jan Rural District, in the Central District of Tonekabon County, Mazandaran Province, Iran. At the 2006 census, its population was 543, in 177 families.

References 

Populated places in Tonekabon County